Tungsten ore is a rock from which the element tungsten can be economically extracted. The ore minerals of tungsten include wolframite, scheelite, and ferberite. Tungsten is used for making many alloys.

Tungsten ore deposits are predominantly magmatic or hydrothermal in origin and are associated with felsic igneous intrusions.

References

Economic geology
Tungsten mining